Catherine Leclerc du Rose, also known by her stage name Mademoiselle de Brie' (1630 – ca. 1706), was a French actress. She was a member of the pioneer troupe of both the Molière's company, and of the Comédie-Française. She belonged to the first Sociétaires of the Comédie-Française (see Troupe of the Comédie-Française in 1680).

Catherine Leclerc du Rose was the daughter of actors. De Brie joined Molière's troupe in 1650. She became a member of the Comédie-Française upon its foundation in 1680. She became a member of the Comédie-Dauphine in 1684.

Notable parts 
 1662.12.26 L' Ecole des femmes (Poquelin)
 1662.12.29 L' Ecole des femmes (Poquelin)
 1663.10.20 L' Impromptu de Versailles (Poquelin)
 1664.02.15 Le Mariage forcé (Poquelin, Charpentier, Lully)
 1664.05.08 La Princesse d'Elide (Poquelin, Lully)
 1664.06.20 La Thébaïde ou les frères ennemis (Racine)
 1666.06.04 Le Misanthrope (Poquelin), acteur (trice)
 1667.06.10 Le Sicilien ou l' Amour peintre (Poquelin)
 1667.08.05 Tartuffe (Poquelin), acteur (trice)

References

Sources 
 Mademoiselle de Brie

External links 
 Caesar.org.uk

1630 births
1700s deaths
17th-century French actresses
French stage actresses
Sociétaires of the Comédie-Française